Phlegra is both a real and a mythical location in both Greek and Roman mythology.

Phlegra is a peninsula of Macedonia (more specifically in Chalkidike) in modern Greece; it is an ancient name for Pallene in historical Thrace, the latter as per the toponymy of the ancients; Pallene – and Phlegra – is most commonly called nowadays Kassandra, or Peninsula of Kassandra. In Greek mythology, it is the site of Zeus's overthrowing of the Giants (Gigantes) at the end of the Gigantomachy.

The Greek geographer Strabo (c.63 BC – c. 24 AD) writes:

Nevertheless, various places have been associated with the Gigantomachy. 
The presence of volcanic phenomena, and the frequent unearthing of the fossilized bones of large prehistoric animals throughout these locations may explain why such sites became associated with the Giants. Pindar writes that the battle occurred at Phlegra ("the place of burning"), as do other early sources. Phlegra was said to be an ancient name for Pallene,  and Phlegra/Pallene was the usual birthplace of the Giants and site of the battle. Apollodorus, who placed the battle at Pallene, says the Giants were born "as some say, in Phlegrae, but according to others in Pallene". But the name Phlegra and the Gigantomachy were also often associated, by later writers, with the Phlegraean Plain, the volcanic fields, at the east of  Cumae. Diodorus Siculus presents a war with multiple battles, with one at Pallene, one on the Phlegraean Fields, and one on Crete. Even when, as in Apollodorus, the battle starts at one place, individual battles between Giant and god might range farther afield, with Enceladus buried beneath Sicily, and Polybotes under the island of Nisyros (or Kos).

According to  the Greek geographer, the Giants who survived, were driven out by Heracles, finding refuge with their mother in Leuca (Apulia), in Italy's 'heel'.  A fountain there had smelly water the locals claimed to be from the ichor of the giants. Strabo also mentions an account of Heracles battling Giants at Phanagoria, a Greek colony on the shores of the Black Sea.

See also
 Greek mythology in popular culture
 Phlegra (disambiguation)

References

External links
 Scholia Graeca in Aristophanem. 824

Locations in Greek mythology
Phlegraean Fields